Dave Koffel is an American gasser drag racer.

Koffel drove a dark blue 1949 Packard, dubbed Flintstone Flyer, in E/Gas.  He later drove a 1959 Studebaker, Flintstone Flyer Too, in F/G.

The  Packard, built in Koffel's garage, had a  Chevrolet V8 (from a 1961 Corvette) and a four-speed manual transmission. *1961 Corvette did not have a 292 engine available. Needs further research, as a 292 inline-six was not wildly available from Chevrolet until roughly 1962*

It was his first gasser class title.

In 1963, Koffel replaced the steel front end panels with custom fiberglass items produced by Walt Sari of Ashtabula, Ohio. With the fiberglass panels fitted, Flintstone Flyer won the F/G national title at the 1963 Nationals in Indianapolis.

Notes

Sources
Davis, Larry. Gasser Wars, North Branch, MN:  Cartech, 2003, pp. 13, 183, and 187.

Dragster drivers
American racing drivers